Richard Ruohonen (born March 31, 1971) is an American curler from Brooklyn Park, Minnesota. He is a two-time national champion and as such represented the United States at the 2008 and 2018 World Men's Curling Championships.

Career
Ruohonen made his first appearance at the United States Men's Championship in 1998. He won his first National Championship in 2008, playing third for skip Craig Brown. As Team United States at the 2008 World Men's Championship, they finished the round-robin with 5–6 record, missing the playoffs and ending the tournament in seventh place.

Ruohonen would lose the US Nationals final three times, in 2011, 2013, and 2017, before again earning the gold medal in 2018. His 2018 gold medal team included Greg Persinger, Colin Hufman, and Philip Tilker. At the World Championship they finished in sixth place when they lost their first playoff game to Brad Gushue's Team Canada. 

In 2019 when Ruohonen returned to the National Championship to attempt to defend his title he brought along Jared Allen, retired NFL player, as an alternate. Ruohonen's team lost to John Shuster in the final, with a score of 8–4.

At the 2020 United States Men's Championship Ruohonen made it to the finals for the fourth year in a row, facing John Shuster for the third time out of those four years and, as happened in 2017 and 2019, Shuster prevailed to win the championship.

Personal life
Ruohonen is an American personal injury lawyer who co-founded TSR Injury Law along with Steven Terry and Chuck Slane. Attorney at Law magazine has previously named him "Attorney of the Month". In 2001 he was fellow curler Jason Larway's attorney when they filed a grievance with the United States Olympic Committee and the United States Curling Association over Larway's eligibility to compete at the 2001 United States Olympic Curling Trials.

He is married to Sherry, with two children. He started curling in 1981.

Teams

Grand Slam record

References

External links

Living people
American lawyers
American male curlers
1971 births
Sportspeople from Saint Paul, Minnesota
People from Brooklyn Park, Minnesota
American curling champions